Shahid Khan is a Pakistani Engineer, film actor and producer.

Early life
He was born in Khazana Peshawar. He belongs to Pushtoon. He hails from khazana village of Peshawar.He is famous for his gandageeri.

Education & Career
Shahid Khan completed Bachelor in Electronics Engineering from UET Peshawar (Abbottabad Campus). Unable to find job, he turned to Freelancing but did not work and eventually moved into the Pashto film industry and now at least earning more than an engineer.

Film career

Shahid Khan has been acting in the Peshawar Film Industry of Pakistan since the 1990s and has contributed to various films of the industry. He and his brother Arshad Khan produce and direct Pashto films as well. Khan has contributed to the Pashto film industry, headquartered in Peshawar, at a time of its revival in Pakistan.

Khan has spoken of the importance of making Pashto films more suitable for city audiences, saying "We cannot limit our films to Pashtun culture as we have to exhibit them in other markets."

In 2015, Khan was prevented from filming in the Hazara District due to government restrictions. Khan released a statement saying that there were only a handful of film makers left in the industry and that the government should support them rather than putting sanctions on them.

Filmography

References

Living people
Year of birth missing (living people)
People from Peshawar
Pakistani male film actors
Pakistani film producers
Male actors in Pashto cinema
Male actors in Urdu cinema